Manfuhah al-Jadidah is a subject of Baladiyah al-Batha and a residential neighborhood in southern Riyadh, Saudi Arabia. It shares proximity with Skirinah neighborhood to the north and al-Yamamah and al-Manfuhah neighborhoods to the south.

References 

Neighbourhoods in Riyadh